Timematodea is a small suborder of stick insects, believed to be the earliest diverging branch of the group. It contains only one living genus, Timema, known from the western United States, as well as two fossil genera, Granosicorpes and Tumefactipes from the early Late Cretaceous (Cenomanian) aged Burmese amber of Myanmar, all three of which are assigned to the family Timematidae. Another genus, Electrotimema from the Eocene aged Baltic amber has also been assigned to the suborder, but this placement is tenative as key diagnostic characters of the family were not noted in its description. Key diagnostic characters of the family include trimerous tarsi.

References

Phasmatodea
Insect suborders